Sirochloa is a genus of bamboo in the grass family.

Species
There is only one known species, Sirochloa parvifolia, found in Madagascar and in nearby Comoros and Mayotte.

References

Bambusoideae
Flora of the Western Indian Ocean
Bambusoideae genera
Monotypic Poaceae genera